Mordellistena angulata is a beetle in the genus Mordellistena of the family Mordellidae. It was described in 1944 by Eugene Ray.

References

angulata
Beetles described in 1944